Cynisca chirioi is a worm lizard species in the family Amphisbaenidae. It is endemic to Guinea.

References

Cynisca (lizard)
Reptiles described in 2014
Taxa named by Jean-François Trape
Taxa named by Youssouph Mané
Taxa named by Cellou Baldé
Endemic fauna of Guinea